Illorsuit (old spelling: Igdlorssuit) is a former settlement in Avannaata municipality, in western Greenland. Located on the northeastern shore of Illorsuit Island − northwest of Uummannaq at the mouth of the Uummannaq Fjord − the settlement had 91 inhabitants in 2010. Illorsuit achieved widespread attention when it experienced a severe tsunami on June 17, 2017, due to a magnitude 4.1 earthquake located north of the city. It was abandoned in 2018.

Transport 

Air Greenland serves the village as part of government contract, with mostly cargo helicopter flights from Illorsuit Heliport to Nuugaatsiaq and Uummannaq.

Population 
The population of Illorsuit has dropped by 28 percent relative to the 1990 levels, and by nearly 17 percent relative to the 2000 levels, reflecting a general trend in the region.

Notable People
 Lars Emil Johansen (b. 1946), the second Prime Minister of Greenland
 Rockwell Kent (1882–1971), American artist who spent time in Illorsuit

References 

Former populated places in Greenland
Avannaata
Uummannaq Fjord